The Nord 1221 Norélan was a 1940s three-seat training monoplane designed and built in France by Nord Aviation.

Design and development
Designed as a three-seat trainer and first flown on 30 June 1948 the Norélan was a single-engined low-wing cantilever monoplane with a distinctive large dihedral angle to the wings. Originally to have a retractable tricycle landing gear the design was changed to a fixed tailwheel landing gear. A number of variants with different engines were produced but no production orders were received.

Variants
1221
Prototype with 180hp (134kW) Mathis 8G-20 inverted Vee engine, later converted to 1222.
1222
Prototype re-engined with a 180hp (134kW) Régnier 4L-02 inline engine
1223
Powered by a 240hp (179kW) Argus As 10C inverted Vee engine, one built and prototype re-engined.
1226
Engine-testbed for the 240hp (179kW) Potez 6D-0 inline engine. one built.

Specifications (1221)

References

 

1940s French civil trainer aircraft
Norelan
Single-engined tractor aircraft
Low-wing aircraft
Aircraft first flown in 1948